Pirates of the Caribbean: At World's End is the soundtrack for the Disney movie of the same title, Pirates of the Caribbean: At World's End. It is composed by Hans Zimmer, and features additional music by Lorne Balfe, Tom Gire, Nick Glennie-Smith, Henry Jackman, Atli Örvarsson, John Sponsler, Damon M Marvin and Geoff Zanelli.

Circuit City's initial retail shipments of the album included a free movie poster at checkout, with a minimum ten per store. Best Buy had an exclusive ringtone code, rather than extra tracks as in the previous soundtrack.

The soundtrack debuted at #14 on the US Billboard 200, selling about 35,000 copies in its first week. As of July 11, 2007, the album has sold 118,919 copies in the US.

Track listing

Production
Composer Hans Zimmer estimated that he composed "over five hours of music" because he thought that it might be "a nice idea to throw out everything and start from scratch".

Critical reception
Critical response to the soundtrack differed greatly, though the album was generally well received by fans. On Amazon.com, it holds a 4.7/5 stars, the highest of any Pirates of the Caribbean score. A review by Mike Brennan on soundtrack.net, for example, praised the score as having "a level of thematic complexity that rivals most other franchises", praising its move from heavily synthetic in the Curse of the Black Pearl score to mostly orchestral, as well as its swashbuckling flavor that was missing from the first two entries. His overall rating for the score was 4.5 stars out of 5. Not all critics were impressed, however. Christian Clemmensen, on Filmtracks.com, though he grudgingly admitted the score was "an intelligent merging of thematic ideas from all three films" and employed a "far wider orchestral and choral palette", feels that the score still did not live up to its swashbuckling cohorts, comparing it unfavorably to John Debney's effort for Cutthroat Island. He also complained about the anthem-like statements of the love theme in One Day and Drink Up Me Hearties, saying, "...there is no style to that music. Only power". In the end, his score was two stars out of five, a rating that several visitors to the site were incensed by on the review's comments page.

Credits
Music composed by Hans Zimmer
Score produced by: Hans Zimmer, Bob Badami & Melissa Muik
Executive Soundtrack Album Producers: Jerry Bruckheimer & Gore Verbinski
Executive in Charge of Music and Soundtracks for Walt Disney Pictures and the Buena Vista Music Group: Mitchell Leib
Music Supervisor: Bob Badami
Executive in Charge of Music Production for the Buena Vista Motion Pictures Group: Monica Zierhut
Music Creative/Marketing for the Buena Vista Motion Pictures Group: Glen Lajeski
Music Business and Legal Affairs: Scott Holtzman and Sylvia Krask
Director of Soundtracks for the Buena Vista Music Group: Desiree Craig-Ramos
Supervising Technical Music Coordinator: Thomas Broderick
Additional Music by: Lorne Balfe, Tom Gire, Nick Glennie-Smith, Henry Jackman, Atli Orvarsson, John Sponsler, Geoff Zanelli
Supervising Music Editor: Melissa Muik
Music Editors: Katie Greathouse, Barbara McDermott
Supervising Orchestrator: Bruce Fowler
Orchestrators: Walt Fowler, Elizabeth Finch, Ken Kugler, Suzette Moriary, Steve Bartek
Music Preparation: Booker White
Score Recorded by: Alan Meyerson, Slamm Andres
Album Mixed by: Alan Meyerson, Big Al Clay
Additional Recording by: Jeff Biggers, Big Al Clay, Greg Vines, Matt Ward
Featured Musicians:
Phil Ayling – Oboe
Chris Bleth – Duduk
Pedro Eustache – Ethnic Woods
Karen Han – Erhu
Lili Haydn – Fiddle
Frank Marocco – Accordion
Heitor Pereira – Banjo
Simon Phillips – Drums
Tom Raney – Cimbalom
Martin Tillman – Cello
Gore Verbinski – Guitar
Featured Vocalist: Delores Clay
Principal Musicians:
Endre Granat – Concertmaster
Julie Gigante – Principal 2nd Violin
Brian Dembow – Viola
Steve Erdody – Cello
Nico Abondolo – Bass
Jim Walker, Geri Rotella – Flutes
Phil Ayling – Oboe
Jim Kanter – Clarinet
Michael O'Donnovan – Bassoon
Jim Thatcher – Horn
Malcolm McNab – Trumpet
Charlie Loper – Trombone
Doug Tornquist – Tuba
Orchestra conducted by: Blake Neely, Nick Glennie-Smith
Featured Musician Soloists co-produced by: Jimmy Levine, Nick Glennie-Smith
Orchestra contractors: Sandy DeCrescent, Peter Rotter
Technical Music Assistants: Pete Oso Snell, Kevin Globerman, Jacob Shea, Bobby Tahouri, Dan Zimmerman
Digital Instrument Design by: Mark Wherry
Production Coordinator for Hans Zimmer: Andrew Zack
Sample Development: Claudius Bruese
Sample Development Assistants: Zain Effendi, Mark McCormick
Score recorded at:
Todd AO Scoring Stage, Studio City, CA
Fox Scoring Stage, Century City, CA
Sony Scoring Stage, Culver City, CA
Choir Recorded by: Geoff Foster
Choir Contractor: Isobel Griffiths
Choir Master: Jenny O'Grady
Choir: Metro Voices
Soprano: Hila Plitmann
Choir conducted by: Matthew Dunkel
UK Music preparation: Jill Streater
UK Music Coordinator: Nyree Pinder
Choir recorded at: Air Lyndhurst Studios, London and Abbey Road Studios, London
Score mixed at: Remote Control Productions, Santa Monica, CA
Music Production Services: Steven Kofsky
Studio Coordinator: Czarina Russell
Music Production Intern: Seth Glennie-Smith
Scoring stage crew: Chris Barrett, Alison Burton, Bryan Clementes, Andrew Dudman, Mark Eshelman, Dominic Gonzales, Tom Hardisty, Sam Jones, Tim Lauber, Adam Michalak, Francesco Perlangelli, Denis St. Amand, Jay Selvester, Tom Steel, Chelley Sydow
Mastered by: Patricia Sullivan at Bernie Grundman Manstering, Hollywood CA
Creative Direction: Steve Gerdes
Album Design: Sean Tejaratchi
"Hoist the Colours"
Cabin Boy Vocals by Brendyn Bell
Singing Gallows Pirates: Chris Allport, Lawrence Cummings, Jim Raycroft, Robert Hovencamp, Geoffrey Alch, Ned Werimer, Samuela Beasom, Jessica-Elisabeth
Lyrics by Ted Elliot and Terry Rossio
Music by Hans Zimmer and Gore Verbinski

References

External links
 Soundtrack analysis at MovieMusic.com

2007 soundtrack albums
2000s film soundtrack albums
Classical music soundtracks
Walt Disney Records soundtracks
Hans Zimmer soundtracks
At World's End
Disney film soundtracks
Fantasy film soundtracks